John W. Bowman Jr. (born March 20, 1958), better known by his stage name DJ Kool, is an American DJ and rapper who produced several popular rap singles in the late 1980s.

Career
Raised in Washington, D.C., his influence from years of working the go-go and rap circuits became apparent in his music.

In 1996, he released the single "Let Me Clear My Throat" on American Recordings, which charted around the world including the top 40 on the Billboard Hot 100 and top 10 in the UK and Netherlands in March 1997. The song prominently features a sample of "The 900 Number" by the 45 King (which itself features a sample from Marva Whitney's "Unwind Yourself", repeated over a breakbeat for six minutes). The song also began by sampling "Hollywood Swinging" by Kool & the Gang. The song is a recognizable dance floor-filler, and the track remains popular .

In 2003, DJ Kool contributed to the song "Hit the Floor" from the "Macho Man" Randy Savage studio album, Be a Man.

Discography

Albums

Singles
"The Music Ain't Loud Enuff" (1988)
"What the Hell You Come in Here For" (1989)
"Reggae Dance" (1990) 
"I Can Make You Dance" (1992)
"20 Minute Workout" (1994)
"I Got Dat Feelin'" (1995)
"Let Me Clear My Throat" (1996)

References

External links
 Yahoo Biography
 Musicmatch guide
 Fansite
 
 

1958 births
Living people
American hip hop DJs
Rappers from Washington, D.C.
Go-go musicians
21st-century American rappers
21st-century African-American musicians
20th-century African-American people